HMAS Coonawarra is a Royal Australian Navy (RAN) base located in Darwin, Northern Territory, and is home to nine fleet units of the RAN. The current commander is Captain Moses Raudino, ADC, RAN.

History
During World War I, Port Darwin had been used as a coaling station for naval ships, but it was not considered a naval base. All were destroyed in the Japanese attack on Darwin on 19 February 1942.

The first naval depot at Darwin was established in January 1935. This was a naval reserve depot, commanded by Lieutenant Commander H.P. Jarrett. At this time, Darwin was part of the Naval Reserve District of Queensland. In 1937, the Naval District of the Northern Territory was separated from the Queensland District, and the first District Naval Officer, Lieutenant Commander J.H. Walker, was appointed. In 1939, under the recommendation of the Committee of Imperial Defence, a high-powered radio transmitter was constructed. The period leading up to World War II saw a buildup of personnel, the establishment of fuelling facilities, a boom depot and later the Navy paid for improvements to Darwin's water supply in order to provide an adequate supply of water for visiting naval ships.

Throughout World War II, the Wireless Transmitting Station provided essential communications service in support of Allied Operations in the South West Pacific regions. The base suffered significant damage during the Japanese bombing raids on the city.

After World War II, the base continued to be known as HMAS Melville. The development of Darwin during the 1950s and 1960s saw the size of Melville shrink, the problem was intensified by the continued growth of naval personnel in Darwin. It was decided to decommission Melville and relocate the RAN's Darwin base to naval Wireless Transmitting Station Coonawarra. Although the base was transferred over and commissioned at HMAS Coonawarra on 16 March 1970, facilities at Melville remained operational until their destruction by Cyclone Tracy on 25 December 1974.

On 30 November 2012, fourteen firearms were stolen from an  moored at the base. The weapons were recovered the next day.

Facilities and operational units
The wharf can accommodate six vessels, berthed three abreast. Services such as fuel, electrical power, compressed air, sewerage out, oily waste suction, and defuelling is available at the berthing points.

In 2016 the Australian Government announced plans to significantly redevelop Coonawarra as one of northern Australia's key strategic naval bases. The plans announced projected that the base will support an increased maritime force, including some of the twelve new offshore patrol vessels that will be based in Darwin. An 1.2 billion injection was expected to commence in 2025.

Ships stationed

See also

List of Royal Australian Navy bases
Larrakeyah Barracks

References

External links
HMAS Coonawarra official website

Coonawarra
Military installations established in 1935
1935 establishments in Australia
Military installations in the Northern Territory
Cyclone Tracy